Greystone Park is a 2012 found-footage horror film written by Sean Stone and Alexander Wraith, directed by Sean Stone, and starring Sean Stone, Alexander Wraith, Antonella Lentini, Oliver Stone and Bruce Payne.

Plot

The film is said to be based on true life experiences. Sean Stone and Alexander Wraith play filmmakers who meet at a dinner with Oliver Stone (Sean's real-life father) when  Wall Street: Money Never Sleeps was being filmed in October 2009. They start to discuss ghost stories. As a result, Sean and Alexander decide to visit an abandoned psychiatric hospital in New Jersey, famous for its radical treatment of patients with mental illness, 'to explore whether or not they believe in the supernatural'. Once inside the institution, they soon discover that they are not alone.

Cast
Sean Stone as himself
Alexander Wraith as himself
Oliver Stone as himself
Antonella Lentini as herself
Bruce Payne as Demon (voice)
Michael Stone as Billy Lasher
Pete Antico as himself
Monique Zordan as herself
John Schramm as himself

Reception
Greystone Park has received negative reviews from critics.

Release
The working titles of the film were Graystone and SecretStone. The film was released on DVD in the UK in August 2012, under the title The Asylum Tapes, and it is due to be released in the US in October 2012.

References

External links

2012 films
2012 horror films
American horror films
2010s ghost films
2010s supernatural horror films
Films set in 2009
Films set in abandoned buildings and structures
Films set in New Jersey
Films set in psychiatric hospitals
Found footage films
2012 directorial debut films
2010s English-language films
2010s American films